'Harqal (also spelled Hurukul or Hreiqel) is a village in northern Syria located northwest of Homs in the Homs Governorate. According to the Syria Central Bureau of Statistics, Harqal had a population of 489 in the 2004 census. Its inhabitants are predominantly Alawites.

References

Bibliography

 

Populated places in Homs District
Alawite communities in Syria